Dixon, as is common in England, or Dickson, is a patronymic surname, traditionally Scottish and thought to have originated upon the birth of the son of Richard Keith, son of Hervey de Keith, Earl Marischal of Scotland, and Margaret, daughter of the 3rd Lord of Douglas.

History

"Nisbet in his Heraldry (Edinburgh 1722) says 'The Dicksons are descendants from Richard Keith, said to be a son of the family of Keith, Earls Marischals of Scotland' and in proof thereof carry the chief of Keith Marischal. This Richard was commonly called Dick and the 'son' was styled after him. The affix of son in the Lowlands answering the prefix Mac in the Highlands." As a result, Clan Dickson is considered a sept of Clan Keith. Richard Keith's son, Thomas, took the surname "Dickson," meaning "Dick's son" or "Richard's son".

Thomas Dickson (1247–1307) himself has quite a history. He was associated in some way with William Wallace, and was killed by the English in 1307 in battle. Tradition states he was slashed across the abdomen but continued to fight holding the abdominal wound closed with one hand until he finally dropped dead. He is buried in the churchyard of St Brides, Douglas, and his marker shows him with a sword in one hand holding his belly with the other. Robert the Bruce made him Castellan of Castle Douglas the year before he was killed.

The Dicksons/Dixons (and 30 other derivates) family name was first found in Scotland whilst the Dixons in England who are of Scottish descent from Thomas Dickson living in 1268 are of the same origin as the Scottish Dicksons. Early records show Thomas Dicson, a follower of the Douglas clan, at the capture of Castle Douglas in 1307.

The Dickson's coat of arms show the Keith "pallets gules" and the Douglas "mullets argent", this is to show their descent from these two ancient Scottish noble families. The family mottoes include "Fortes fortuna juvat", "Coelum versus", for Dickson: translated as "Fortune favours the brave", Heavenward"; whilst "Quod dixi dixi" Dixon, is translated as "What I have said I have said".

Individuals named Dick appear in records in England in the early 12th Century with Dickie Smith in the Lancashire Curia Rolls (1220) and Dik in the Cheshire Assize Court Rolls (1260). The patronym, Dikson, first appears in the Subsidy Rolls of Cumberland in 1332 and appears to be unrelated to the Earl Marshal of Scotland.

People

A–D
Aaron Dixon, American activist
Abram Dixon (1787–1875), New York politician
Adrian Dixon, radiologist and Master of Peterhouse, Cambridge
AJ Dixon, motorcycle pioneer and racing driver
Alan Leonard Dixon, English cricketer
Alan J. Dixon, American senator
Alesha Dixon, British singer
Alfred Cardew Dixon, mathematician
Alfred Herbert Dixon (1857–1920), British businessman
Alice Dixon Le Plongeon (1851–1910), English photographer
Alice Dixon Le Plongeon, English photographer and archaeologist
Ambrose Dixon, 17th-century American pioneer
Amzi Dixon, American preacher
Andrew Graham-Dixon, British art critic
Annie Dixon, English painter
Antonio Dixon, American football player
Archibald Dixon, American politician
Arrington Dixon, American politician
Arthur Lee Dixon, mathematician, younger brother of Alfred Dixon 
Bill Dixon,  American jazz musician
Brandon Dixon, American baseball player
Chuck Dixon, American comic book writer
Clarence Dixon, American murderer
Clay Dixon, American politician
Colin Dixon, Welsh rugby league footballer
Colton Dixon, American musician
Cromwell Dixon, American aviation pioneer
Cyril Dixon, English footballer
Dai'Jean Dixon (born 1998), American football player
Daniel Dixon, 2nd Baron Glentoran
David Dixon, British actor and screenwriter
D'Cota Dixon (born 1996), American football player
Dean Dixon, American conductor
Dennis Dixon, American football player
De'Shaan Dixon (born 1998), American football player
Donna Dixon, American actress
Dougal Dixon, Scottish geologist

E–J
Ella Hepworth Dixon (1857–1932; pseudonym, "Margaret Wynman"), English writer, novelist, editor
Eugene Dixon, birth name of American singer Gene Chandler
Fitz Eugene Dixon Jr., American philanthropist, owner of the Philadelphia 76ers
Floyd Dixon, American R&B pianist
Frank M. Dixon, American politician
Franklin W. Dixon, pseudonym used for Hardy Boys novel authors
Fred Dixon (politician), Canadian politician
Geoff Dixon, Australian CEO
George Dixon (rugby league), English rugby league footballer of the 1920s and 1930s
Chris Dixon (1943–2011), Rhodesian Air Force pilot
Hal Dixon (biochemist) (1928–2008), Irish biochemist
Hal Dixon (umpire) (1920–1966), American baseball umpire
Hanford Dixon, American footballer
Henry Hall Dixon, British sporting writer
Henry Horatio Dixon, Irish biologist
Herbert Dixon, 1st Baron Glentoran
Hewritt Dixon, American football running back
Ida Dixon (1854–1916), American golf course architect
Isaiah Dixon (1923–2013), American politician
Ivan Dixon, American actor
James Dixon (conductor), American conductor
James R. Dixon, American herpetologist
Jamie Dixon (born 1965), American basketball coach
Jane Holmes Dixon, Bishop of Washington
Jeane Dixon (1904–1997), American astrologer
Jeremiah Dixon, surveyor on the Mason–Dixon line
Jerry Dixon (actor), American actor, director, choreographer and composer 
Jerry Dixon (musician), American musician
Jess Dixon, Canadian politician
Jessy Dixon, American gospel singer
Joan Dixon, American actress
Joseph M. Dixon, American politician
Juan Dixon, American basketball player
Julian C. Dixon, Californian politician

K–Z
Kerry Dixon, English footballer
Lance J. Dixon (born 1961), American theoretical physicist
Lee Dixon (actor), American actor and singer
Lee Dixon, English footballer
Leslie Dixon, American screenwriter
Lisa Dixon, American psychiatry professor
Lorna Dixon, Australian Aboriginal custodian and preserver of the Wangkumara language
Maggie Dixon (1977–2006), American basketball coach (sister of Jamie Dixon)
Malcolm Dixon (actor), English actor
Malcolm Dixon (rugby league), English rugby league player
Malcolm Dixon, British biochemist
Malik Dixon, American basketball player in Israel Basketball Premier League
Marcus Dixon, American football player
Mary J. Scarlett Dixon (1822-1900), American physician
Matthew Charles Dixon, recipient of the Victoria cross
Maxwell Dixon, American rapper known as Grand Puba
Medina Dixon (1962–2021), American basketball player
Monica Dixon, American political organiser
Mort Dixon (1892–1956), American lyricist
Norman F. Dixon (1922–2013), British psychologist
Sir Owen Dixon, Chief Justice of Australia
Patrick Dixon, British business analyst and author
Peg Dixon (1923-2015), Canadian actress
Peter Dixon (born 1944), English rugby union player
Peter Dixon (economist) (born 1946), Australian economist
Piers Dixon (1928–2017), British politician
Rap Dixon, American baseball player
Reg Dixon, Canadian sailor
Reg Dixon (comedian), English comedian
Reginald Dixon, British theatre organist
Richard Watson Dixon, English poet
Robert M. W. Dixon (Robert Malcolm Ward Dixon), Australian linguist
Robin Dixon, 3rd Baron Glentoran (born 1935)
Rod Dixon, New Zealand runner
Ron Dixon (American football), American footballer
Roscoe Dixon (1949–2021), American politician
Samantha Dixon (born 1965), British politician
Scott Dixon (boxer), Scottish boxer of the 1990s, 2000s and 2010s
Scott Dixon, racing driver from New Zealand
Sharon Pratt Dixon, later Sharon Pratt Kelly, mayor of Washington, D.C.
Sheila Dixon, mayor of Baltimore
Sir Daniel Dixon, 1st Baronet (1844–1907), mayor of Belfast
Sonny Dixon, American TV anchorman
Stan Dixon (1894–1979), English footballer
Thomas Homer-Dixon, Canadian political scientist
Travis Dixon, American media studies scholar
Tudor Dixon (born 1977), American politician and commentator
Waliyy Dixon (born 1974), American streetball player
Wheeler Winston Dixon, American film director
William Hepworth Dixon, British historian
Willie Dixon, American blues musician

Disambiguation pages
Ben Dixon (disambiguation), multiple people
Cecil Dixon (disambiguation), multiple people
Charles Dixon (disambiguation), multiple people
Don Dixon (disambiguation), multiple people
George Dixon (disambiguation), multiple people
John Dixon (disambiguation), multiple people
Larry Dixon (disambiguation), multiple people
Michael Dixon (disambiguation), multiple people
Paul Dixon (disambiguation), multiple people
Richard Dixon (disambiguation), multiple people
Robert Dixon (disambiguation), multiple people
Stephen Dixon (disambiguation) or Steve Dixon, multiple people
Thomas Dixon (disambiguation), multiple people
Tom Dixon (disambiguation), multiple people

Fictional characters
Marcus Dixon (Alias), fictional character from the TV series Alias
Daryl Dixon and Merle Dixon, fictional characters from the TV series The Walking Dead
George Dixon, police constable in the 1950s/70s British TV series Dixon of Dock Green

See also
Dixon v. Alabama, a landmark civil-rights case, appellant St. John Dixon
Dixon (disambiguation)
Dickson (surname)

English-language surnames
Surnames of Lowland Scottish origin
Patronymic surnames
Surnames from given names